The National Baseball Congress of Wichita, Kansas is an organization of 17 amateur and semi-professional baseball leagues operating in the United States and Canada. Since its founding in 1935 by Hap Dumont, it has conducted an annual North American championship tournament among its members, The National Baseball Congress World Series has been held annually since 1935, at Wichita's Lawrence–Dumont Stadium through 2018; at Wichita State's Eck Stadium in 2019; and jointly at Eck Stadium and Wichita's Riverfront Stadium starting in 2020.

History
Dumont said he was inspired to start the league after seeing a huge crowd for the circus clown-firemen baseball game in Wichita (the clowns were not allowed to perform on Sundays because of blue laws).

In 1931, he started the National Semi-Pro Baseball Congress Kansas State Tournament on former Ackerman Island in Wichita (located a few blocks north of Lawrence Stadium).  After a fire destroyed the old wood stadium, the city built the Lawrence Stadium on its present site.

In 1935, he offered Satchel Paige $1,000 to bring his touring Bismarck Churchills from Bismarck, North Dakota to Wichita. Paige struck out 60 batters and won four games.

With the rise of Minor League Baseball, the league now is for amateur athletes.

Leagues
, there are 17 member leagues.

Championships

The first National Baseball Congress World Series was held in 1935.

* In 1948, the London Majors defeated Fort Wayne in the best-of-seven-game Can-Am Congress Series, 4-3.

Graduate of the Year
Many players have gone to professional teams.  Since 1975 the NBC has recognized a "Graduate of the Year".

See also
Amateur baseball in the United States
Baseball awards#U.S. collegiate summer baseball
National Semipro Championship

References

External links
National Baseball Congress website

Baseball governing bodies in the United States
Baseball governing bodies in Canada
College baseball in the United States
Amateur baseball in the United States
Baseball in Kansas
Sports in Wichita, Kansas
Organizations based in Wichita, Kansas
Non-profit organizations based in Kansas
501(c)(3) organizations
Sports organizations established in 1934
1934 establishments in Kansas